Milo's Astro Lanes is a 1998 bowling game for the Nintendo 64 developed by Player 1 and published by Crave Entertainment. The game takes place in a space setting where there are intergalactic bowling alleys. It makes use of the Rumble Pak and the Controller Pak. The latter must be used for the former to be used.

Features

 6 playable characters
 12 galactic lanes
 6 types of bowling balls
 Multiplayer modes including 4 player simultaneous mode
 Variety of specials available

Reception

The game was met with average reception, as GameRankings gave it a score of 69% based on only four reviews.

Although there were plans made by Capcom to bring Milo's Astro Lanes to Japan under the title Space Bowler Milo (スペース・ボーラー マイロー) in December 1999, they were eventually canceled due to continuously low sales of the Nintendo 64 in the country.

Notes

References

External links
 

1998 video games
Bowling video games
Crave Entertainment games
Nintendo 64 games
Nintendo 64-only games
Video games developed in the United States